Pu'er is a prefecture-level city in southern Yunnan Province, China. The urban administrative center of Pu'er is Simao District, which is also the former name of the prefecture-level city itself. A major downturn in the price of tea in 2007 caused severe economic distress in the area. The price of Pu'er has since recovered and Pu'er tea still contributes much to the income of the area.

Etymology

Nanzhao set a division called Bu'ri Jian in 839 AD; this was the first time the region was integrated into the administrative system of a Chinese dynasty. In the Yuan dynasty, the central government changed the name to Pu'ri in 1278. Finally in Ming dynasty, the name was changed to "Pu'er" in 1384. The character of "er" was changed to 洱 in Wanli Emperor period. The name "普洱" (Pu'er) has continued to be used to this day. Wa scholar Ni-ga states that the origin name "Bu'ri" is the exonym of Blang people in Baraoke language, a dialect of Wa language, which means "my brother".

Pu'er tea has the name "Pu'er" because Pu'er was the distribution centre of the tea produced in the south-west of Yunnan during the Ming and Qing dynasty. Pu'er tea became world-famous, and the city Pu'er also became famous as a result of the tea.

History

Its name was changed to Simao in 1950 following the Communist victory in the Chinese Civil War, while its surrounding county was known as Pu'er. In 2007, the town's name was changed back to Pu'er; the surrounding area became known as Ning'er County; and the name Simao was taken by a town and district within the city. The change had an effect on the size of the official Pu'er tea production area, a major regional product.

Geography and climate
Pu'er is located in southern/southwestern Yunnan, on the lower reaches of the Mekong (known in Chinese as the Lancang), with the bordering prefectures being Yuxi to the northeast, Honghe to the east, Xishuangbanna to the south, Lincang to the northwest, and Dali and Chuxiong. It also shares borders with Vietnam (Điện Biên Province), Laos (Phongsaly Province), and Burma (Shan State), being the only prefecture in Yunnan to border all three countries. As with much of the province, mountainous terrain dominates its administrative area, covering 98.3%.

Located at an altitude of above  and within a degree south of the Tropic of Cancer, Pu'er, as with much of southern Yunnan, has a warm humid subtropical climate (Köppen Cwa), with muddled distinction between the seasons and daytime temperatures remaining warm year-round. With monthly percent possible sunshine ranging from 24% in July to 69% in February, the city receives 2,038 hours of bright sunshine annually.

Administrative divisions

Transport
Asian Highway Network AH3
China National Highway 213
Kunming–Bangkok Expressway
Pu'er Simao Airport

Notes

References

External links

Tea, City Share Pu'er Name

 
Cities in Yunnan